Jesse Huta Galung was the defending champion, but lost in the first round to Jan-Lennard Struff.
Damir Džumhur won the title, defeating Igor Sijsling in the final, 6–1, 2–6, 6–1.

Seeds

Draw

Finals

Top half

Bottom half

References
 Main Draw
 Qualifying Draw

2015 ATP Challenger Tour
2015 Singles
2015 in Dutch tennis